Uswatta Liyanage Ivor Sylvester Sunil Perera (Sinhala: සුනිල් පෙරේරා; 14 September 1952 – 6 September 2021) was a Sri Lankan vocalist, guitarist, songwriter and composer. Described as one of the most influential musicians in Sri Lankan music history, Perera was the leader and the lead vocalist of The Gypsies. He was associated with Sri Lanka's baila genre, and gained the nickname "Baila Chakravarthy".

Personal life 
Perera was born on 14 September 1952, in a family with ten siblings. His father, Anton Perera, was in the military before becoming a musician and forming the original Gypsies band. Anton was a clerk at the government Postal Department and also run a sweet production company called "Glucorasa". His mother was Dorine Perera. He started his education at St. Sebastian's College, Moratuwa until grade four and then until finishing school in the St Peter's College, Colombo. During his school days he was also a member of the college band. When he was 11 years old, he became a guitarist.

Perera was married to Geetha Kulatunga who was born on 18 March 1967, whom he met while she was studying for her O/L classes. She also meets Sunil while he is attending a concert. Kulatunga's father, Mahinda, is a sub-inspector with the Sri Lanka Police. On 25 October 1981, Perera was arrested by police in Homagama following reports from Kulatunga's parents that he had abducted her; the case was later dropped. When Kulatunga was aged 16, she and Perera got engaged.

He had two sons: Sajith and Gayan, and two daughters: Rehana and Manisha. Eldest son Sajitha is married to the daughter of famous singer Dalreen Suby. His younger son, Gayan is a musician who formed the band "Daddy". His nephew, Lanthra Perera is also a musician and the founder-member of the band "Doctor".

Death
In August 2021, Perera tested positive for COVID-19 and rumors of his death started circulating on social media. In spite of treatment, on 5 September, he was re-admitted to hospital due to pneumonia and died in the early hours of 6 September 2021, one week before his 69th birthday.

Musical career 
At the age of 11, he started to play guitar. His father initially expected him to pursue his higher studies and then to make him a professional doctor. However, he was not able to pursue his higher education due to inadequate results in GCE O/L examinations. His father made arrangements for Sunil to do GCE O/L examination privately, but Sunil again could not produce expected results in order to further continue his studies. Sunil later conveyed his interest in music to his father. In 1969, at the age of 15 when he left school, Sunil joined the band The Gypsies created by his father, Anton Perera, along with his brothers – Nihal, Lal, Nimal, Piyal and uncle's son Neville; there were seven of the crew in all. He learned guitar under Vincent Jayawardane and George Ferdinando and had voice training under Loren Abeysekara, Lily Godridge and Maryanne David.

Later, The Gypsies group consisted of his own brothers and cousins. Accordingly, Nihal, Lal, Nimal and Piyal formed a group of seven including two cousins. Sunil was the main vocalist of the band, along with his brother Piyal Perera. His father also built a studio for the band next to the house on Galle Road in Ratmalana where they were staying at the time. In the '70s, they released nearly 5 albums titled 'Dance with Gypsies'. Their first hit "Linda Langa Sangamaya" was released in 1972/1973 along with "Amma Amma Me Mata". In the mid-1970s, his other brothers left the band and got involved in business activities. In 1980, the Gypsies released the first cassette with the song "Kurumitto". Other tracks sung by Gypsies include, "Kadapathakin", "None Mage Sudu None" (1977), "Lunu Dehi" (1987), "Uncle Johnson" (1987), "Oye Ojaye" (1989), "Piti Kotapan None" and "Signore" (1997). Their song 'Lunu Dehi' released in 1987 was a song that made an amazing difference on the concert stage in the country. In the year 1997, they changed the course of the music field with the song "Piti Kotapan None".

Sunil's recent works, such as "I Don't Know Why" address sociopolitical issues through humor. However, several of his songs have been banned by the state media due to their criticisms of the government. In 2017, he released the song "Koththamalli". He also sang and released "Buongiorno" in 2018, which was the first hit song to be released under the Gypsies label after a gap of four years. In 2019, he sang the song "Diyawannawe Inna" for the film Jaya Sri Amathithuma.

The band The Gypsies celebrated their Golden Jubilee in 2021 by arranging a concert via virtual platforms.

Ideology 
Sunil Perera recently came up with his own ideology about the sociopolitical situation in the country. He was highly critical of Sri Lankan society and politics. He openly talked about sensitive topics, such as sex, which are often deemed as taboo subjects in conservative Sri Lanka. He was also a vocal critic of the administration of Gotabaya Rajapaksa and Mahinda Rajapaksa over the years. In 2015, he revealed that he was afraid of being a target of the Rajapaksa family when Mahinda Rajapakse lost the 2015 Sri Lankan presidential election.

In January 2017, Sunil went to the Department of Inland Revenue and insisted that he should pay income tax. Earlier, he had been paying tax for his income as a member of the music group only.

Filmography

Discography

Ma Nowana Mama

Dance With The Gypsies Vol. 1

Dance With The Gypsies Vol. 3

Signore

Dance With The Gypsies Vol. 5

Gypsies Gold

Koththamalli

References

External links 
 Obituary, The New York Times
 I'm a MD Sauce fan – Sunil Perera
 Justice Ministry needs to bear responsibility for delays: Sunil Perera
 Justice system within Lanka has deteriorated disappointingly – Sunil Perera
 Why does Sunil Perera wear Pirith Nool?
 Thomian bash with the Gypsies
 
 සංගීතයයි දේශපාලනයයි මික්ස් කරලා
 ජිප්සීස් නායක සුනිල් පෙරේරා
 සුනිල් සීයා රෝයල් වැඩේ
 සුනිල් පෙරේරා යහපාලනය ගැන කතා කරයි
 ගෝඨාබය එනවට පට්ට බයයි, සජිත්ට ඡන්දය දෙන්න

1952 births
2021 deaths
Sri Lankan Roman Catholics
Sinhalese musicians
Alumni of St. Sebastian's College, Moratuwa
20th-century Sri Lankan male singers
21st-century Sri Lankan male singers
Deaths from the COVID-19 pandemic in Sri Lanka
Sri Lankan singer-songwriters